Jean-Pierre Heynderickx (born 5 May 1965) is a Belgian former racing cyclist turned Sports director for . He rode in the 1988 and 1990 Tour de France. In 2019 he left  for his current team.

Major results
Sources:

1987
 1st GP Stad Vilvoorde
 2nd Road race, National road championships
 5th Circuit des XI Villes
 10th Grand Prix Cerami
1988
 1st Stage 4 Tour d'Armorique
 4th Kuurne–Brussels–Kuurne
 9th Paris–Tours
1989
 1st Stage 22 Vuelta a España
 4th Kuurne–Brussels–Kuurne
 10th Le Samyn
1990
 1st Clásica de Sabiñánigo
 3rd Circuito de Getxo
1991
 3rd Clásica de Sabiñánigo
 5th Binche–Chimay–Binche
 6th De Kustpijl
1992
 3rd Dwars door België
 4th Road race, National road championships
 4th Scheldeprijs
 4th Halle–Ingooigem
 10th Grand Prix La Marseillaise
1993
 1st Zomergem–Adinkerke
 2nd Overall Étoile de Bessèges
 4th Cholet-Pays de Loire
 5th Tour de Vendée
 7th Grand Prix de Fourmies
 7th Brussels Cycling Classic
 8th Grand Prix Impanis-Van Petegem
 8th Paris–Tours
 10th Dwars door België
1994
 1st Stage 5 Étoile de Bessèges
 2nd Memorial Rik Van Steenbergen
 9th Overall Tour d'Armorique
 9th Binche–Chimay–Binche
1995
 1st Clásica de Almería
 1st Zomergem-Adinkerke
 3rd Paris–Bourges
 5th Omloop van de Vlaamse Scheldeboorden
 9th Road race, National road championships
 9th De Kustpijl
 9th Halle–Ingooigem
 9th Grand Prix d'Isbergues
1996
 2nd Binche–Chimay–Binche
 4th Omloop van de Vlaamse Scheldeboorden
1997
 4th Paris–Mantes-en-Yvelines
 7th Tour de l'Eurométropole
1998
 3rd Omloop van het Houtland
 5th GP Stad Vilvoorde
 5th Omloop van de Vlaamse Scheldeboorden
 7th Grote Prijs Stad Zottegem

Grand Tour general classification results timeline

References

External links

1965 births
Living people
Belgian male cyclists
Sportspeople from Ghent
Cyclists from East Flanders